Majorana is an Italian surname. Notable people with the surname include:

Cristoforo Majorana, Italian limner and painter
Ettore Majorana (born 1906; probably died after 1959), Italian theoretical physicist
Quirino Majorana (1871–1957), Italian experimental physicist

See also
Maiorana

Italian-language surnames